Sir Richard Stapley  (23 October 1842 – 20 May 1920) was a British businessman, philanthropist and Liberal Party politician.

Background
Stapley was born the son of Robert Stapley, of Twineham, Sussex. In 1866, he married Annie Jenner. He was knighted in 1908. In 1919 he founded the Sir Richard Stapley Educational Trust.

Political career
Stapley was Liberal candidate for the Brixton division of Lambeth at the 1892 General Election. He was Liberal candidate for the Holborn division of Finsbury at the January 1910 General Election. 
He did not stand for parliament again. He was also a Justice of the Peace and a Member of Council of the City of London.

Electoral record

References

1842 births
1920 deaths
Liberal Party (UK) parliamentary candidates
Knights Bachelor
English justices of the peace